Lafayette Blanchard Gleason (May 30, 1863 – October 24, 1937) was the secretary of the Republican State Committee of New York from 1906 to 1937, and he was also the General Secretary for seven Republican National Conventions.

Publications
A treatise on the law of inheritance taxation, 1917-1922

References

External links

1863 births
1937 deaths
New York (state) Republicans